"Selfies" is a song by the Scottish singer-songwriter Nina Nesbitt. It was released on 7 February 2014, through Republic Records, as the “official” lead single from her debut album Peroxide (2014). The song has peaked at number 40 on the UK Singles Chart. The song was written by Nina Nesbitt and Thom Kirkpatrick.

Music video
A music video to accompany the release of "Selfies" was first released onto YouTube on 15 December 2013 at a total length of three minutes and forty-two seconds.

Track listing

Chart performance

Weekly charts

Release history

References

2014 songs
Nina Nesbitt songs
2014 singles